Peter Lawrence is a book author and screenwriter who also uses his full name, Geale Peter Lawrence, to distinguish himself from various other writers of the same name.  His book and screen credits are usually seen as  'By Peter Lawrence.'

Published work includes the Frankenstein Vigilante Series of Steampunk Mysteries which take place in a dystopian world, a parallel existence to today's society. Book One is titled The Incorruptibles; Book  Two The Fear; and Book Three The Reckoning. The series is written with long-time collaborator Chris Trengove. Their latest novel is Flash Chord, a love story set largely in England at the time of the Christine Keeler/Mandy Rice-Davis scandal.

Also written with Trengove is a series of horror novellas: Blood Ranch, Loom, and Night of the Dogs. Trengove and Lawrence first collaborated on It's Your Money In My Pocket, Dear, Not Mine In Yours; Engulfed In A Tide Of Filth (re-published as Up The Pictures); The Mao Tse Tung Workers Revolutionary Striptease Emporium; and the music business cult classic Full Moon.

It's Your Money, Engulfed/Up The Pictures, and Striptease Emporium are part of an ongoing series, The London Chronicles.

Writing solo, Lawrence has published Fishing For Crocodiles, a 'fictionalized autobiography' about growing up in Northern Rhodesia/Zambia; and Smoke and Dust, a dramatic and meticulously researched and observed novel set in South and Southern Central Africa in the late 19th and early 20th centuries.

Books for younger readers, and the adults who read to them, include The Princess Formerly Known As Snow White, Little Red (The Wolf's Tale) and two books about 'Shandy' and 'Roly' - 'Two Small Dogs From Africa.' Shandy and Roly are illustrated by the late and legendary Takashi Masunaga.

In addition to writing books, Lawrence works in film and television as a screenwriter and story editor/producer. He has been commissioned by many U.S., European and Asian studios and producers, including BLT; Disney; Cinemedia/Overseas Film Group; Constantin Film; Forum Media; Fox; Industry Entertainment/Sony; London Weekend Television; Magder/ITT; Rankin-Bass/ABC; Rialto; Roxy; and TorStar.

Lawrence has extensive credits in animation and children's entertainment, having been the story editor/show-runner on iconic TV series like ThunderCats; SilverHawks; Peter Pan and the Pirates and The Real Adventures of Jonny Quest.

Lawrence and Trengove continue to write together and separately.  A fourth Frankenstein Vigilante is in the works and they are developing a live action series under option by a Hollywood major.

Lawrence also works in partnership with the Colombian animation studio, Domo Animato. (Domoanimato.com)

He lives largely in Colombia.

Year of birth missing (living people)
Living people
English screenwriters
English male screenwriters
English biographers
English writers about music
English memoirists
English television producers
English male non-fiction writers